Ryszard Kunze (born 12 December 1939) is a Polish fencer. He competed in the team foil event at the 1960 Summer Olympics.

References

1939 births
Living people
Polish male fencers
Olympic fencers of Poland
Fencers at the 1960 Summer Olympics
People from Wejherowo
Sportspeople from Pomeranian Voivodeship
20th-century Polish people
21st-century Polish people